The principle of unicity explains that each event, each living being, each object, each person or each circumstance has the characteristic of its uniqueness, of its particularity. Other similar events, living beings, objects, persons or circumstances may exist, but never the same entity.

References

Uniqueness